Gabriël Garcia (28 October 1903 – 23 April 1970) was a Spanish racing cyclist. He rode in the 1928 Tour de France.

References

External links
 

1903 births
1970 deaths
Spanish male cyclists
Place of birth missing
Sportspeople from the Province of Palencia
Cyclists from Castile and León